Mocuba Solar Power Station, is an operational 40 megawatt solar power plant in Mozambique. The public–private partnership project, sells the energy produced to the national electric utility, Electricidade de Moçambique (EDM), under a 25-year power purchase agreement.

Location
The development is located in the municipality of Mocuba, in Zambezia Province, in the central coastal region of Mozambique. The geographical coordinates of Mocuba Solar Power Station are: 16°49'22.0"S, 37°02'05.0"E (Latitude:-16.822778; Longitude:37.034722).

Overview
The power station was developed by a consortium, the Mocuba Solar Energy Consortium, comprising (a) Scatec Solar, a Norwegian independent solar power producer (b) the Mozambican electricity utility company Electricidade de Moçambique and (c) KLP Norfund Investments, a subsidiary of Norfund. The power station produces 40 megawatts of electricity, which EDM will purchase for 25 years from the date of commissioning, according to an agreement signed between the owners of the power station and the Government of Mozambique.

Ownership
Mocuba Solar Power Station is owned by the entity that developed it, Mocuba Solar Energy Consortium. The table below illustrates the shareholding within the consortium:

Timeline
Construction began in June 2018 and was completed in July 2019. Commercial commissioning was effected in August 2019.

Funding
The funds used to construct this power station, whose cost price is reported as US$76 million, were borrowed from (a) the World Bank Group and (b) the Emerging Africa Infrastructure Fund.

Other considerations
During the construction phase, this project created 1,209 jobs, with 1,052 of them being local. The solar power plant is expected to save the country approximately 79,000 tonnes of carbon dioxide emissions annually.

See also

List of power stations in Mozambique

References

External links
 Early Warning System: Project Description As of 27 October 2016.

Renewable energy power stations in Mozambique
Solar power stations in Mozambique
Zambezia Province
Energy infrastructure completed in 2019
2019 establishments in Mozambique